Harrison Greenbaum (born September 14, 1986) is an American stand-up comedian and comedy writer.

Early life
Greenbaum was born in Manhattan, New York, and grew up in Woodmere, New York, on Long Island.  He graduated as valedictorian of his class at Lawrence High School.

Greenbaum attended Harvard, where he graduated summa cum laude in 2008 and won the 2006 Visiting Committee Prize for Undergraduate Book Collecting for his collection of magic books.  He also won the Gordon W. Allport Prize for his psychology thesis, "'Did you hear the one about the...?': The effect of racial humor on prejudice."

While at Harvard,  Greenbaum co-founded the Harvard College Stand-Up Comic Society.

Career
Greenbaum has performed at many of the leading comedy clubs throughout the world including Carolines on Broadway, Gotham Comedy Club, Comix NY, Comic Strip Live, and the Laugh Factory, and is a regular at the Comedy Cellar.  He continues to perform in more than 600 shows a year, making him one of the most in-demand stand-up comedians currently working in New York City, and leading the New York Daily News to refer to him as "the hardest-working man in comedy."

Currently performing as a Comedian with the Cirque du Soleil show, Mad Apple, at the New York New York Hotel in Las Vegas. He has been with the show since it began its run in May of 2022.

Television
In 2013, Greenbaum was the warm-up comedian for the first season of Katie, Katie Couric's talk show on ABC, and a producer on Would You Fall for That? on ABC.

He was also featured in the first season of Gotham Comedy Live on AXS.TV and in the special Gotham Comedy Live episode, "Best of Season 4: New York, the City that Never Bleeps".

In 2014, Greenbaum was a special guest on Brain Games on National Geographic Channel.

In 2015, Greenbaum was a semi-finalist on Last Comic Standing on NBC.

In 2017, Greenbaum auditioned for America's Got Talent on NBC, performing stand-up comedy.

In 2018, Greenbaum performed on Conan on TBS.

Hosting
Greenbaum was an official co-host of the 2010 Times Square New Year's Eve World Wide Webcast and was the host of the New York Innovative Theatre Awards, held at Cooper Union's Great Hall in 2011 and at Kaye Playhouse in 2012.

Greenbaum is a writer for MAD Magazine.

Awards and recognition
Greenbaum is the winner of the 2010 Andy Kaufman Award, given in recognition of creativity and originality in comedy. He is also the winner of the 2011 Magners Comic Stand-Off and a 2011 Shorty Award for excellence in short-form social media (i.e. Twitter). Greenbaum was named one of 2010's "Comics to Watch" by Comedy Central and one of the "Best of the Breakout Artists" by Carolines on Broadway and Punchline Magazine.  As part of Carolines' Breakout Artists Series, Greenbaum headlined the club, becoming the first performer to sell out a "Breakout" show. Greenbaum became a member of the New York Friars' Club in 2009, making him one of the youngest people ever inducted into the legendary club. On August 5, 2017, Greenbaum was awarded the Clarke Crandall Award for Comedy and the 80th Abbott's Magic Get-Together in Colon, Michigan, the Magic Capital of the World.

References

External links
 Official website

1986 births
American stand-up comedians
American comedy writers
Harvard College alumni
Living people
People from Manhattan
People from Woodmere, New York
Comedians from New York (state)
Lawrence High School (Cedarhurst, New York) alumni
21st-century American comedians
Shorty Award winners